Jørgen Haugan  (born 1941) is a Norwegian author and lecturer. He was written a number of books, principally biographies of noted Scandinavian writers.

Haugan earned a doctorate in philosophy in 1977 from the University of Copenhagen with a thesis on Henrik Ibsen.

Haugan received the Georg Brandes award for his biography of Martin Andersen Nexø in 1999. Haugan completed his biography of Knut Hamsun in 2004. Haugan works as a lecturer in the Department of Scandinavian Studies and Linguistics at the University of Copenhagen. He had previously worked at the University of Trondheim.

Selected bibliography
Henrik Ibsens metode: Den indre utvikling gjennem Ibsens dramatikk (Oslo, 1977)
Diktersfinxen - En studie i Ibsen og Ibsen-forskningen (Oslo, 1982)
400 Årsnatten - Norsk Selvforståelse Ved En Korsvei  (Oslo, 1991)
Alt Er Som Bekendt Erotik - En Biografi Om Martin Andersen Nexø (Copenhagen, 1998)
Solgudens fall. Knut Hamsun, en litterær biografi  (Oslo, 2004)

References

External links
Jørgen Haugan profile

1941 births
Living people
Norwegian biographers
Norwegian male writers
Male biographers
Knut Hamsun researchers
University of Copenhagen alumni
Academic staff of the University of Copenhagen
Academic staff of the Norwegian University of Science and Technology
Norwegian expatriates in Denmark